The Street Singer is a 1924 musical play written by Frederick Lonsdale with music by Harold Fraser-Simson and lyrics by Percy Greenbank.

After premiering at the Prince of Wales's Theatre, Birmingham it ran for 360 performances at the Lyric Theatre in the West End between 27 June 1924 and the 2 May 1925. The cast included Phyllis Dare, Sylvia Leslie, Dorothy Fane, A.W. Baskcomb and Harry Welchman.

References

Bibliography
 Wearing, J. P. The London Stage 1920-1929: A Calendar of Productions, Performers, and Personnel. Rowman & Littlefield, 2014.

1924 plays
Musicals by Frederick Lonsdale
British musicals